William Julius D. ("Bill") Escher (1931 – May 12, 2014) was an aerospace engineer involved in the early development of the United States rocket programs and long time aerospace industry visionary. He was an internationally recognized expert in the field of high-speed airbreathing propulsion and hypersonic flight. He was a long been a proponent of combined-cycle propulsion systems for space access and his visionary 'Synerjet' concept is industry recognized. He wrote over a hundred technical papers on this subject and others such as hydrogen energy and lunar exploration.

He had a long career in aerospace spanning more than 60 years. While in the Army and assigned to the Naval Research Lab (NRL), he was a countdown officer for the Vanguard rocket program in 1957. He was later employed by NASA (Lewis, Marshall, and Headquarters), Marquardt, Kaiser-Marquart, North American Rockwell and Rocketdyne, Astronautics Corporation of America, University of Toronto, Escher Technology Assoc., Escher-Foster Technology Assoc., SAIC, and SpaceWorks. He was also one of the co-founders and long time members of the Space Propulsion Synergy Team (SPST).

He was the author of the SAE book entitled "Synerjet Engine: Airbreathing/Rocket Combined-Cycle Propulsion for Tomorrow's Space Transports."

In 1988, he was awarded the prestigious AIAA George M. Low Space Transportation Award for excellence in the field of space transportation. His Low award citation reads: "For outstanding and sustained contributions to the field of space transportation, from Vanguard to Spaceliner, and for tirelessly promoting a vision for low cost, reliable access to space based on the Synerjet combined-cycle engine."

He held a Bachelor of Science in Engineering degree from George Washington University, having earlier undertaken studies in mechanical engineering at Cornell University and Cleveland State University. At Cornell, he served as the president and experimental committee chairman of the Cornell Rocket Society. He also conducted graduate studies at the University of Southern California and the University of Wisconsin-Madison.

External links
 AIAA: William J Escher, SAIC, Region II - South East, Greater Huntsville George M. Low Space Transportation Award, 2002.
 Amazon The Synerjet Engine Airbreathing Combined Cycle Propulsion for Tomorrow's Space Transports.
 NASA NTRS A US History of Airbreathing/Rocket Combined-Cycle (RBCC) Propulsion for Powering Future Aerospace Transports, with a Look Ahead to the Year 2020.
 AIAA The seven operating modes of the Supercharged Ejector Scramjet (SESJ) combined-cycle engine.
 NASA NTRS Spaceliner Class Operability Gains Via Combined Airbreathing/ Rocket Propulsion: Summarizing an Operational Assessment of Highly Reusable Space Transports.
 NASA NTRS Marquardt's Mach 4.5 Supercharged Ejector Ramjet (SERJ) High-Performance Aircraft Engine Project: Unfulfilled Aspirations Ca.1970.
 SpaceWorks Enterprises, Inc. SpaceWorks Engineering, Inc. (SEI) Announces the Addition of Mr. William "Bill" Escher to Engineering Staff.
 SpaceWorks Enterprises, Inc. The Hypersonic ETO Space Transporter as an Enabling Element for Acquiring Commercial Human-rated Space Transportation Capabilities.
 AIAA Aerospace America, March 2008.
 AIAA Synerjet for Earth/orbit propulsion - Revisiting the 1966 NASA/Marquardt composite (airbreathing/rocket) propulsion system study (NAS7-377).

1931 births
2014 deaths
George Washington University School of Engineering and Applied Science alumni
NASA people
American aerospace engineers
Cleveland State University alumni
Cornell University College of Engineering alumni